Pedro Claro Meurice Estiu (February 23, 1932 in San Luis, Santiago de Cuba – July 21, 2011 in Miami, Florida USA) was the Roman Catholic archbishop of the Roman Catholic Archdiocese of Santiago de Cuba, Cuba.

Ordained to the priesthood on June 26, 1955, he studied canon law at the Pontifical Gregorian University in Rome.  When he returned to Cuba in October 1958, he was named vice chancellor and secretary to the Archbishop of Santiago de Cuba, Enrique Perez-Serantes. Meurice Estiu was appointed auxiliary bishop of the Archdiocese of Santiago de Cuba and Titular Bishop of Teglata in Numidia in 1967 by Pope Paul VI. On July 4, 1970, he was appointed archbishop and retired in 2007.

In 2011, he traveled to Miami for treatment for a diabetic condition, where he died on July 21 at Mercy Hospital.

Notes

References
 The Miami Herald; Pedro Meurice Estiu, 79 - Retired Cuban Catholic archbishop by Juan Carlos Chavez; Saturday, July 24, 2011; Page 4B.

External links

21st-century Roman Catholic bishops in Cuba
People from Santiago de Cuba Province
1932 births
2011 deaths
20th-century Roman Catholic bishops in Cuba
Roman Catholic bishops of Santiago de Cuba
Roman Catholic archbishops of Santiago de Cuba